"Shadow on the Wall" is a single by musician Mike Oldfield, released in 1983 by Virgin Records. English rock singer Roger Chapman performs vocals on the song and it is taken from Oldfield's Crises album. The song was a hit single especially in Germanic countries.

The music video for "Shadow on the Wall" depicts an interrogation scene and was directed by Keith McMillan. The song also features on Roger Chapman's compilation albums, such as 1994's King of the Shouters where the song has been 'remastered'.

An "acoustic" mix and a 5.1 surround sound mix were released on the 2013 reissue of Crises.

The song has been covered by a number of artists including Swedish metal band Arch Enemy.

B-side
The B-side is "Taurus 3", a short, fast-paced flamenco-guitar piece, which is notably different from Oldfield's long multi-themed pieces, "Taurus" and "Taurus 2", on QE2 and Five Miles Out respectively.

Track listing

7 inch
"Shadow on the Wall" – 3:09
"Taurus 3" – 2:25

12 inch
"Shadow on the Wall" (Extended version) – 5:07
"Taurus 3" – 2:25

Chart positions

Weekly charts

Year-end charts

Personnel
Mike Oldfield – guitars, banjo, bass, Fairlight C.M.I., Roland strings
Roger Chapman – vocals
Ant – guitars
Simon Phillips – Tama drums
Phil Spalding – backing vocals (extended version)

References

1983 singles
1983 songs
British hard rock songs
Mike Oldfield songs
Number-one singles in Austria
Songs written by Mike Oldfield
Virgin Records singles